Deniz Altı Horasan (Bu Gün Bayram Günüdür), (Bugün Ayın Üçüdür), (Hele Hele Ninnaye), Elaziz Uzun Çarşı (Elazığ uzun çarşı) is a Turkish and Armenian folkloric tune (Kaşık Havası) or Halay.

References

Turkish music
Turkish songs
Armenian music
Armenian songs
Year of song unknown
Songwriter unknown